Walter Talbot may refer to:
 Walter Carpenter, also known as Walter Cecil Talbot, Royal Navy officer
 Walter Richard Talbot, African American mathematician